is an international hotel chain comprising  properties in Asia, Europe, North America, and the South Pacific. It is owned by Okura Hotels. Nikko Hotels International (NHI) began operations in 1972 as the global hotel brand of Japan Airlines, with its first property located in Jakarta. The first NHI-operated hotel in Japan opened in 1973. Other Nikko properties have been owned and operated by other entities; among the oldest Nikko properties is the Ginza Nikko, which opened in 1959.

 
Nikko Hotels International used to be owned by Japan Airlines Development Company Limited, which in the 1990s was renamed JAL Hotels. Following its acquisition in 2010, it became a subsidiary of Okura Hotels. Hotel Nikko affiliates include the Hotel Royal properties in Southeast Asia.

Hotel locations

Nikko Hotels International

Japan

JR Tower Hotel Nikko Sapporo, Sapporo, Hokkaido
 Hotel Nikko Northland Obihiro, Obihiro, Hokkaido
 Hotel Nikko Narita, Narita, Chiba
 Kawasaki Nikko Hotel, Kawasaki, Kanagawa
 Hotel Nikko Tachikawa Tokyo, Tokyo
 Grand Nikko Tokyo Daiba, Tokyo
 Hotel Nikko Niigata, Niigata
 Hotel Nikko Kanazawa, Kanazawa, Ishikawa
 Hotel Nikko Princess Kyoto, Shimogyo-ku, Kyoto
 Hotel Nikko Osaka, Chuo-ku, Osaka
 Hotel Nikko Kansai Airport, Kansai International Airport
 Hotel Nikko Himeji, Himeji-shi, Hyogo
 Hotel Nikko Nara, Nara-shi, Nara
 Hotel Nikko Kochi Asahi Royal, Kochi, Kochi
 Hotel Nikko Fukuoka, Hakata-ku, Fukuoka
 Hotel Nikko Huis Ten Bosch, Sasebo, Nagasaki
 Hotel Nikko Kumamoto, Kumamoto
 JAL Private Resort Okuma
 Hotel Nikko Alivila/Yomitan Resort Okinawa, Yomitan-son, Okinawa
 Hotel Nikko Naha Grand Castle, Naha, Okinawa
 Hotel Nikko Yaeyama, Ishigaki, Okinawa

Southeast Asia and Pacific
 

 Hotel Nikko New Century Beijing, Beijing, China
 Hotel Nikko Shanghai, Shanghai, China
 Hotel Nikko Dalian, Dalian, China
 Hotel Nikko Taizhou, Taizhou, Jiangsu, China
 Hotel Nikko Suzhou, Suzhou, China
 Suzhou Qingshan Hotel, Suzhou, China
 Hotel Nikko Hong Kong (now New World Millennium Hong Kong Hotel), Hong Kong
 Hotel Nikko Tianjin, Tianjin, China
 Hotel Nikko Wuxi, Wuxi, China
 Hotel Nikko Guangzhou, Guangzhou, China
 Hotel Nikko Guam, Guam
 Hotel Nikko Bali Benoa Beach, Indonesia
 Hotel Nikko Jakarta, Jakarta, Indonesia (now the Pullman Hotels, Jakarta) as of January 2012
 Grand Nikko Bali, Bali, Indonesia (now Hilton Bali Resort) as of January 2017
 Hotel Nikko Palau, Palau
 Hotel Nikko Kaohsiung, Kaohsiung, Taiwan
 Hotel Nikko Hanoi, Hanoi, Vietnam
 Hotel Nikko Saigon, Ho Chi Minh, Vietnam
 Hotel Nikko Kuala Lumpur, Kuala Lumpur, Malaysia (later sold to InterContinental Hotels Group as of November 2011 and now known as InterContinental Kuala Lumpur)

North America

 Hotel Nikko, San Francisco, San Francisco, U.S.A.

Europe
 Hotel Nikko Düsseldorf, Düsseldorf, Germany

Affiliates

 Nikkō Kanaya Hotel, Kanaya, Japan
 The Okura Prestige Taipei, Taipei, Taiwan
 Hotel Royal-Nikko Taipei, Taipei, Taiwan
 Hotel Nikko Palau, Palau
 Hotel Nikko Saigon, Saigon, Vietnam

References

Hospitality companies of Japan
Hotel chains
Japanese brands
Japan Airlines